A corporation sole is a legal entity consisting of a single ("sole") incorporated office, occupied by a single ("sole") natural person. This structure allows corporations (often religious corporations or Commonwealth governments) to pass without interruption from one officeholder to the next, giving positions legal continuity with subsequent officeholders having identical powers and possessions to their predecessors. A corporation sole is one of two types of corporation, the other being a corporation aggregate.

Ecclesiastical origins
Most corporations sole are church related (for example, the archbishopric of Canterbury), although some political offices of the United Kingdom (e.g., many of the secretaries of state), Canada, and the United States are corporations sole.

The concept of corporation sole originated as a means for orderly transfer of ecclesiastical property, serving to keep the title within the denomination or religious society. In order to keep the religious property from being treated as the estate of the vicar of the church, the property was titled to the office of the corporation sole. In the case of the Catholic Church, ecclesiastical property is usually titled to the diocesan bishop, who serves in the office of the corporation sole.

The Catholic Church continues to use corporations sole in holding titles of property: as recently as 2002, it split a diocese in the US state of California into many smaller corporations sole and with each parish priest becoming his own corporation sole, thus limiting the diocese's liability for any sexual abuse or other wrongful activity in which the priest might engage. This is, however, not the case everywhere, and legal application varies. For instance, other U.S. jurisdictions have used corporations at multiple levels. In the jurisdictions of England and Wales, Scotland, Northern Ireland, and the Republic of Ireland, a Catholic bishop is not a corporation sole, and real property is held by way of land trusts, a tradition dating back to the suppression of Catholicism by Henry VIII during the English Reformation and the Penal Laws of Ireland.

The Church of Jesus Christ of Latter-day Saints uses the corporation sole form for its president, which is legally listed as "The Corporation of the President of the Church of Jesus Christ of Latter-day Saints".

Iglesia ni Cristo was registered as corporation sole with the Insular Government of the Philippines in 1914 and with the People's Republic of China in 2014.

The corporation sole form can serve the needs of a religious organization by reducing its complexity to that of a single office and its holder, thereby eliminating the need for by-laws and a board of directors.

The Crown

Within most constitutional monarchies, notably the Commonwealth realms, the Crown is a nonstatutory corporation sole. Although conceptually speaking, the office and officeholder retain dual capacities in that they may act both in a corporate capacity (as monarch) and in an individual capacity (as a private person), they are inseparably fused in law; there is no legal distinction between the office and the individual person who holds it. The Crown (state) legally acts as a person when it enters into contracts and possesses property. As a person, the monarch (officeholder) may hold properties privately, distinct from property he or she possesses corporately, and may act as monarch separate from their personal acts. For example, Charles III as a natural person holds several separate offices, such as king of the United Kingdom, king of Canada, king of Australia, and the supreme governor of the Church of England, all of which are distinct corporations sole, even as he acts as a natural person in his private capacities separate and apart from his role filling these various offices (corporations). Likewise, the office of prime minister has use of certain properties and privileges, such as an official residence and decision-making powers, that remain with the office once the officeholder leaves, even as the officeholder may own property in a private capacity.

The sovereign's status as a corporation sole ensures that all references to the king, the queen, His Majesty, Her Majesty, and the Crown are synonymous, referring to exactly the same legal personality over time. While natural persons who serve as sovereign pass on, the sovereign never legally dies; thus the corporate nature of the office of sovereign ensures that the authority of the state continues uninterrupted. In other words, the sovereign is made a corporation sole to prevent the possibility of disruption or interregnum, thereby preserving the stability of the Crown (state). For this reason, at the moment of the demise of the sovereign, a successor is immediately and automatically in place.

As a corporation sole, the legal person of the sovereign is the personification of the state and consequently acts as  guarantor of the rule of law and the fount of all executive authority behind the state's institutions. As certain countries have federal systems of government, the sovereign in these cases also possesses capacities as distinct corporation sole in right of each of the Australian states and Canadian provinces; for example, as His Majesty the King of Australia in Right of Queensland and His Majesty the King of Canada in Right of Alberta.

Secular application in the United States
Every state of the United States recognizes corporations sole under common law, and about a third of the states have specific statutes that stipulate the conditions under which that state recognizes the corporations sole that are filed with that state for acquiring, holding, and disposing of title for church and religious society property. Almost any religious society or church can qualify for filing as a corporation sole in these states. There can be no legal limitation to specific denominations, therefore a Buddhist temple or Jewish Community Center would qualify as quickly as a Christian church. Some states also recognize corporations sole for various other non-profit purposes including performing arts groups, scientific research groups, educational institutions, and cemetery societies.

Examples of in the United Kingdom
 The Crown (sometimes regarded as a corporation aggregate)
 Auditor General for Wales
 Chief Executive of Skills Funding
 Children's Commissioner for England
 Children's Commissioner for Wales
 Commissioner for Older People for Northern Ireland
 Commissioner of Police of the Metropolis
 Comptroller and Auditor General
 Corporate Officer of the House of Commons
 Corporate Officer of the House of Lords
 The Dawat-e-Hadiyah
 Duke of Cornwall
 Duke of Lancaster
 Information Commissioner
 Mayor (of London)'s Office for Policing and Crime
 Judicial Appointments and Conduct Ombudsman
 Lord Mayor of the City of London
 Official Custodian for Charities
 Immigration Services Commissioner
 Police Ombudsman for Northern Ireland
 Public Services Ombudsman for Wales
 Public Trustee
 Pubs Code Adjudicator
 Receiver for the Metropolitan Police District (abolished)
 Registrar General
 many secretaries of state in the United Kingdom (various; most recently Foreign, Commonwealth and Development Affairs)
 Solicitor for the affairs of the Duchy of Lancaster, the
 Treasury Solicitor
 London Fire Commissioner

In the Church of England 
 Archbishop of Canterbury
 Archbishop of York
 Bishops of the Church of England
 Deans of the Church of England
 Rectors and Team Rectors in the Church of England
 Vicars in the Church of England

Examples of corporations sole elsewhere
 The Diocese of Hong Kong
 Corporation of the President of The Church of Jesus Christ of Latter-day Saints
 Corporation of the Presiding Bishop of the Church of Jesus Christ of Latter-day Saints
 Dai al-Mutlaq, the
 Director of National Parks, Australian government
 Governor General of Canada
 Minister of the Government, Republic of Ireland
 New Zealand's Office of the Privacy Commissioner
 Public Trustee
 New Zealand Public Trustee
 Māori Trustee, New Zealand
 Office of the sovereign of Canada
 The Archbishop of Manila
 The Archbishop of New York

See also
 Legal person

References

English law
Corporations